Luke Adams may refer to:

Luke Adams (basketball), American basketball player
Luke Adams (footballer) (born 1994), Australian-born New Zealand footballer
Luke Adams (potter) (1838–1918), New Zealand potter
Luke Adams Pottery, decorative ceramics manufacturer in Christchurch, New Zealand 
Luke Adams (racewalker) (born 1976), Australian race walker

See also
Luke Adam (born 1990), Canadian ice hockey player
Luke Adamson (born 1987), English rugby league footballer